Dhiban, (Arabic:  Ḏiʾbān) known to the Moabites as Dibon (Hebrew:  Dīḇōn), is a Jordanian town located in Madaba Governorate, approximately 70 kilometres south of Amman and east of the Dead Sea. Previously nomadic, the modern community settled the town in the 1950s. Dhiban's current population is about 15,000, with many working in the army, government agencies, or in seasonal agricultural production. A number of young people study in nearby universities in Karak, Madaba, and Amman. Most inhabitants practice Islam.

History
The ancient settlement lies adjacent to the modern town. Excavations have revealed that the site was occupied intermittently over the past 5,000 years, its earliest occupation occurring in the Early Bronze Age in the third millennium BC. The site's extensive settlement history is in part due to its location on the King's Highway, a major commercial route in antiquity. The majority of evidence for this population is concentrated in a 15-hectare tel. The release of the Mesha Inscription in 1868 led to an upsurge in visitors to the town (including tourists and scholars) due to its ostensible confirmation of biblical passages.

Bronze Age
The first substantial settlement at Dhiban's tel was during the Early Bronze Age. Archaeological evidence for a habitation of the tel between the Early Bronze Age and Iron Age has not yet been found. However, the disturbed archaeological context at the site means that this might not be definitive. Dhiban might correspond with the town “Tpn” or “Tbn” found in Egyptian texts from the reigns of Thutmoses III, Amenhotep III, and Rameses II.

Dhiban and the Israelites
According to the Bible, the Israelites stopped at Dhiban during the Exodus. The Bible mentions "Divon", or "Divon Gad" because the city was said to have been occupied by the tribe of Gad. The name in Biblical Hebrew means wasting or pining.  

According to the Mesha Stele found at the site, Mesha, a Moabite king from the 9th century BCE, expelled the Israelites and established ancient Dhiban as an important settlement in the kingdom of Moab.

Mesha and the Iron Age Moabite Kingdom
The Mesha Inscription connected Dhiban with the biblical “Dibon” as well as implying that it was the capital of Mesha, a prominent Moabite king from the 9th century BCE, though its role in Mesha's reign has not been confirmed. In the Iron IIb period, Dhiban underwent at least three large building projects. The tel was artificially enlarged during this period and included several new architectural features, including retaining walls, towers, and a monumental city wall. The building dates of these features have not been confirmed, but might be somewhere between the 9th and 8th centuries BCE. These large buildings appear to have been abandoned in the Iron IIc period. The site also featured a large necropolis to the northeast of the tel. This contained multi-generational burials with corresponding funerary offerings, and one had a clay coffin with an anthropomorphic lid. The necropolis appears to be contemporary with these building projects.
Another name for Dibon was Karchoh, and there is the possibility that in the 9th century the name Dibon referred to a tribe of which Mesha was the leader, and that the name Dibon was attached to the town later (see van der Steen and Smelik 2007)

Hellenistic Dhiban and the Nabataeans
There has been little evidence recovered from the site for the Persian, Hellenistic, and early Nabataean periods. But several lines of evidence indicate that Dhiban became part of the Nabataean empire in the mid-1st century BCE. These include Nabataean-style ceramics, coins, and architecture (such as a temple with a Nabataean-like layout, Nabataean masonry, an aqueduct, retaining wall, and monumental stairway).

Roman and Byzantine Dhiban
In 106 the Romans incorporated Nabataean territories into their own empire, including Dhiban. The Nabataean monumental buildings were abandoned and there were indications of a population decrease at the site. Coins, a multi-generational family tomb, and an inscription do, however, indicate that the site remained inhabited and there were some building projects during this time. The inscription also suggests that the Romans maintained a road near the site, which might have been the King's Highway. Later on in the Roman period and leading into the Byzantine period Dhiban's population began gradually increasing in size. It was even mentioned in Eusebius’ Onomasticon as a very large village in the 4th century. Excavations have uncovered two significant buildings from this time period—a bathhouse and two churches.

Early and Middle Islamic Periods
The exact date of Dhiban's early Islamic period settlement is under debate and could be from the 7th- 8th century Umayyad period or the 8-9th century Abbasid period. The community thrived during this time and covered most of the tel by the 14th century Mamluk period, if not earlier during the 13th century Ayyubid period. Several structures on the site have been dated to this period using coins and ceramics.

In  1261, the Mamluk sultan Baibars granted Dhiban as an iqta to the son of an Ayyubid prince. Dhiban prospered throughout the 1200s and 1300s. It lay on the region's main trade route and supplied meat to nearby towns. The town had a diverse agricultural economy, with einkorn wheat and barley supplemented with grapes, figs, lentils, and chickpeas. Agriculture in Dhiban heavily depended upon the use of cisterns providing water for irrigation, since the semi-arid climate made rainfall uncertain. People practiced multi-cropping and raised pigs, sheep, goats, and cattle; they also caught fish, shellfish, and crab. 

However, Dhiban appears to have declined in importance after 1356, when the nearby town of Hisban lost its status as capital of the al-Balqa region in favour of Amman. Periods of drought in the ensuing years exacerbated this decline, and Dhiban was abandoned during the early years of Ottoman rule.

Late Islamic and Hashemite Periods
The Ottoman defter for Transjordan from 1538 to 1596 neglected Dhiban, which implies that the settlement declined through the 16th century. Families of the pastoral nomadic Bani Hamida tribe established modern Dhiban in the 1950s and both built upon preexisting structures and used them for raw materials. In the following years, the land surrounding the tel was distributed to the community for private ownership and the tel itself remains Jordanian government property.

Archaeology
The first work at Dhibon was conducted by Duncan Mackenzie in 1910, mainly a surface examination

Scientific excavations began at the site in the mid-20th century with the American Schools of Oriental Research’s project in 1950-53 
led by F.V. Winnett and later by W.L. Reed.

The ASOR effort, now led by William Morton, continued with seasons in 1955, 1956, and 1965.

The current excavation and restoration project is the Dhiban Excavation and Development Project, co-directed by scholars at the University of Liverpool, Knox College, and the University of California, Berkeley. Work has been conducted in 2002, 2004, 2005, 2009, 2010, 2012, and 2013.

See also
Cities of the ancient Near East
Isaiah 15
Mesha Stele

Notes

References

Cordova, C., C. Foley, and A. Nowell (2005) Landforms, Sediments, Soil Development, and Prehistoric Site Settings on the Madaba-Dhiban Plateau, Jordan. Geoarchaeology  20(1): 29-56.
Ji, C. (2007) “The Iraq al-Amir and Dhiban Plateau Regional Surveys,” pp. 141–161 in Crossing Jordan – North American contributions to the archaeology of Jordan.  T. Levy, P. M. Daviau, R. Younker and M. Shaer, eds. London: Equinox. 
Ji, C., and J. Lee (2000) A Preliminary Report on the Dhiban Plateau Survey Project, 1999: The Versacare Expedition. Annual of the Department of Antiquities of Jordan  44: 493–506.
Porter, B. et al. “Tall Dhiban 2004 Pilot Season: Prospection, Preservation, and Planning.” Annual of the Department of Antiquities of Jordan 49 (2005): 201-216.

 
 
Routledge, B. (2004) In Moab in the Iron Age: Hegemony, polity, archaeology. Philadelphia, Pa: University of Pennsylvania Press. 
Sauer, J. (1975) Review: The Excavation at Dibon (Dhiban) in Moab: The Third Campaign 1952–1953. Annual of the Department of Antiquities of Jordan 20: 103–9.
Tushingham, A. (1972) The Excavations at Dibon (Dhiban) in Moab (Cambridge: Annual of the American Schools of Oriental Research).
Tushingham, A. (1990) Dhiban Reconsidered: King Mesha and his Works. Annual of the Department of Antiquities of Jordan 34: 182–92.
Tushingham, A., and P. Pedrette (1995) Mesha's Citadel complex (Qarhoh) at Dhiban. In Studies in the History and Archaeology of Jordan, V, edited by Muna Zaghloul (Amman: Department of Antiquities): 151–59.
Van der Steen and Smelik (2007) King Mesha and the tribe of Dibon. In: Journal for the Study of the Old Testament 32:139-162
 
Winnet, F. and W. Reed (1964) The Excavations at Dibon (Dhiban) in Moab: The First and Second Campaigns (Baltimore: J.H. Furst).

External links
Dhiban Excavation and Development Project website
Dhiban Excavation and Development Project Blog on Wordpress
Dhiban Excavation and Development Project Photostream on Flickr
Photos of Dhiban at the American Center of Research

 Populated places in Madaba Governorate
Moab
Archaeological sites in Jordan
Former populated places in Southwest Asia